The nuclear weapons tests of the Soviet Union were performed between 1949 and 1990 as part of the nuclear arms race. The Soviet Union conducted 715 nuclear tests using 969 total devices by official count, including 219 atmospheric, underwater, and space tests and 124 peaceful use tests. Most of the tests took place at the Southern Test Site in Semipalatinsk, Kazakhstan and the Northern Test Site at Novaya Zemlya. Other tests took place at various locations within the Soviet Union, including now-independent Kazakhstan, Uzbekistan, Ukraine and Turkmenistan.

List

See also
 List of nuclear weapons tests

References

Sources

 
 
 

Soviet Union Wespons Tests